Maoricicada tenuis, also known as the northern dusky cicada, is a species of insect that is endemic to New Zealand. This species was first described by John S. Dugdale and Charles Fleming in 1978.

References

Cicadas of New Zealand
Insects described in 1978
Endemic fauna of New Zealand
Cicadettini
Endemic insects of New Zealand